The Grand Collar of the State of Palestine is the highest civilian order of the State of Palestine. It can be given to foreign dignitaries, kings, heads of state or government and persons of similar rank by the State of Palestine.

Notable recipients 
 King Salman of  Saudi Arabia 
 King Hamad of  Bahrain
 King Simeon II of Bulgaria
 Sheikh Nawaf Al-Ahmad Al-Jaber Al-Sabah of  Kuwait, Speaker of the National Assembly Marzouq Al-Ghanem and Prime Minister Jaber Al-Mubarak Al-Hamad Al-Sabah
 President Vladimir Putin of  Russia
 President Dmitry Medvedev of  Russia
 President François Hollande of  France
 President Giorgio Napolitano of  Italy
 President Beji Caid Essebsi,  Tunisia
 President Sebastián Piñera of  Chile
 President Xi Jinping of  China
 President Khalifa bin Zayed Al Nahyan of  UAE
 Prime Minister Narendra Modi of  India. 
 Prime Minister José Luis Rodríguez Zapatero of  Spain
 Prince Walid bin Talal,  Saudi Arabia
 President Kais Saied,  Tunisia
 President Abdelmadjid Tebboune,  Algeria

References

State of Palestine
Orders, decorations, and medals of the State of Palestine